Korean Air Lines Flight 007 (KE007/KAL007) was a scheduled Korean Air Lines flight from New York City to Seoul via Anchorage, Alaska. On September 1, 1983, the flight was shot down by a Soviet Sukhoi Su-15 interceptor. The Boeing 747 airliner was en route from Anchorage to Seoul, but owing to a navigational mistake made by the crew, the airliner drifted from its original planned route and flew through Soviet prohibited airspace around the time of a U.S. aerial reconnaissance mission. The Soviet Air Forces treated the unidentified aircraft as an intruding U.S. spy plane, and destroyed it with air-to-air missiles, after firing warning shots which were probably not seen by the KAL pilots. The Korean airliner eventually crashed in the sea near Moneron Island west of Sakhalin in the Sea of Japan. All 269 passengers and crew aboard were killed, including Larry McDonald, a United States representative. The Soviet Union found the wreckage under the sea two weeks later on September 15 and found the flight recorders in October, but this information was kept secret until 1992.

The Soviet Union initially denied knowledge of the incident, but later admitted to shooting down the aircraft, claiming that it was on a MASINT spy mission. The Politburo of the Communist Party of the Soviet Union said it was a deliberate provocation by the United States to probe the Soviet Union's military preparedness, or even to provoke a war. The US accused the Soviet Union of obstructing search and rescue operations. The Soviet Armed Forces suppressed evidence sought by the International Civil Aviation Organization (ICAO) investigation, such as the flight recorders, which were released ten years later, after the dissolution of the Soviet Union.

The incident was one of the tensest moments of the Cold War and resulted in an escalation of anti-Soviet sentiment, particularly in the United States.

As a result of the incident, the United States altered tracking procedures for aircraft departing from Alaska.

Aircraft

The aircraft flying as Korean Air Lines Flight 007 was a Boeing 747-230B jet airliner with Boeing serial number 20559. The aircraft first flew on January 28, 1972 and was delivered on March 17, 1972, to German airline Condor with the registration D-ABYH. It was sold to the ITEL Corporation in February 1979 and leased to Korean Air Lines with the registration HL7442.

Details of the flight

Passengers and crew

The aircraft flying as Korean Air Lines Flight 007 departed from Gate 15 of John F. Kennedy International Airport, New York City, on August 31, 1983, at 00:25 EDT (04:25 UTC), bound for Kimpo International Airport in Gangseo District, Seoul, 35 minutes behind its scheduled departure time of 23:50 EDT, August 30 (03:50 UTC, August 31). The flight was carrying 246 passengers and 23 crew members. After refueling at Anchorage International Airport in Anchorage, Alaska, the aircraft departed for Seoul at 04:00 AHDT (13:00 UTC) on August 31, 1983. This leg of the journey was piloted by Captain Chun Byung-in (45), First Officer Son Dong-hui (47), and Flight Engineer Kim Eui-dong (31).

The aircrew had an unusually high ratio of crew to passengers, as six deadheading crew were on board. Twelve passengers occupied the upper deck first class, while in business class almost all of the 24 seats were taken; in economy class, approximately 80 seats were empty. There were 22 children under the age of 12 years aboard. 130 passengers planned to connect to other destinations such as Tokyo, Hong Kong, and Taipei.

United States Congressman Larry McDonald from Georgia, who at the time was also the second president of the conservative John Birch Society, was on the flight. Senator Jesse Helms of North Carolina, Senator Steve Symms of Idaho, and Representative Carroll Hubbard of Kentucky (who cancelled his reservations for the trip at the last moment) were aboard sister flight KAL 015, which flew 15 minutes behind KAL 007; they were headed, along with McDonald on KAL 007, to Seoul, South Korea, in order to attend the ceremonies for the thirtieth anniversary of the U.S.–South Korea Mutual Defense Treaty. The Soviets contended former U.S. president Richard Nixon was to have been seated next to Larry McDonald on KAL 007 but that the CIA warned him not to go, according to the New York Post and Telegraph Agency of the Soviet Union (TASS); this was denied by Nixon.

Flight deviation from assigned route
After taking off from Anchorage, the flight was instructed by air traffic control (ATC) to turn to a heading of 220 degrees. Approximately 90 seconds later, ATC directed the flight to "proceed direct Bethel when able". Upon arriving over Bethel, Alaska, KAL 007 entered the northernmost of five  airways, known as the NOPAC (North Pacific) routes, that bridge the Alaskan and Japanese coasts. KAL 007's particular airway, R-20 (Romeo Two Zero), passed just  from what was then Soviet airspace off the coast of the Kamchatka Peninsula.

The autopilot system of the 747-200 has four basic control modes: HEADING, VOR/LOC, ILS, and INS. The HEADING mode maintained a constant magnetic course selected by the pilot. The VOR/LOC mode maintained the plane on a specific course, transmitted from a VOR (VHF omnidirectional range, a type of short-range radio signal transmitted from ground beacons) or Localizer (LOC) beacon selected by the pilot. The ILS (instrument landing system) mode caused the plane to track both vertical and lateral course beacons, which led to a specific runway selected by the pilot. The INS (inertial navigation system) mode maintained the plane on lateral course lines between selected flight plan waypoints programmed into the INS computer.

When the INS navigation systems were properly programmed with the filed flight plan waypoints, the pilot could turn the autopilot mode selector switch to the INS position and the plane would then automatically track the programmed INS course line, provided the plane was headed in the proper direction and within  of that course line. Once that happened, the INS mode would change from "armed" to "capture" and the plane would track the flight-planned course from then on.

The HEADING mode of the autopilot would normally be engaged sometime after takeoff in order to follow vectors from ATC, and then after receiving appropriate ATC clearance, to guide the plane to intercept the desired INS course line.

The Anchorage VOR beacon was not operational at the time, as it was undergoing maintenance. The aircraft was required to maintain the assigned heading of 220 degrees until it could receive the signals from Bethel, then it could fly direct to Bethel, as instructed by ATC, by centering the VOR "to" course deviation indicator (CDI) and then engaging the autopilot in the VOR/LOC mode. Then, when over the Bethel beacon, the flight could start using INS mode to follow the waypoints that makeup route Romeo-20 around the coast of the U.S.S.R. to Seoul. The INS mode was necessary for this route since after Bethel the plane would be mostly out of range from VOR stations.

At about 10 minutes after take-off, flying on a heading of 245 degrees, KAL 007 began to deviate to the right (north) of its assigned route to Bethel and continued to fly on this constant heading for the next five and a half hours.

International Civil Aviation Organization (ICAO) simulation and analysis of the flight data recorder determined that this deviation was probably caused by the aircraft's autopilot system operating in HEADING mode, after the point that it should have been switched to the INS mode. According to the ICAO, the autopilot was not operating in the INS mode either because the crew did not switch the autopilot to the INS mode (as they should have shortly after Cairn Mountain), or they did select the INS mode, but the computer did not transition from "armed" to "capture" condition because the aircraft had already deviated off track by more than the  tolerance permitted by the inertial navigation computer. Whatever the reason, the autopilot remained in HEADING mode, and the problem was not detected by the crew.

There is no evidence to indicate that civil air traffic controllers or military radar personnel at Elmendorf Air Force Base (who were in a position to receive the King Salmon radar output) were aware of KAL 007's deviation in real-time, and therefore able to warn the aircraft. It had exceeded its expected maximum deviation sixfold,  of error being the maximum expected to drift from the course if the inertial navigation system was activated.

KAL 007's divergence prevented the aircraft from transmitting its position via shorter range very high frequency radio (VHF). It, therefore, requested KAL 015, also en route to Seoul, to relay reports to air traffic control on its behalf. KAL 007 requested KAL 015 to relay its position three times. At 14:43 UTC, KAL 007 directly transmitted a change of estimated time of arrival for its next waypoint, NEEVA, to the international flight service station at Anchorage, but it did so over the longer range high frequency radio (HF) rather than VHF. HF transmissions are able to carry a longer distance than VHF, but are vulnerable to electromagnetic interference and static; VHF is clearer with less interference, and is preferred by flight crews. The inability to establish direct radio communications to be able to transmit their position directly did not alert the pilots of KAL 007 of their ever-increasing divergence and was not considered unusual by air traffic controllers. Halfway between Bethel and waypoint NABIE, KAL 007 passed through the southern portion of the North American Aerospace Defense Command buffer zone. This zone is north of Romeo 20 and off-limits to civilian aircraft.

Sometime after leaving American territorial waters, KAL Flight 007 crossed the International Date Line, where the local date shifted from August 31, 1983, to September 1, 1983.

Shoot-down

In 1983, Cold War tensions between the United States and the Soviet Union had escalated to a level not seen since the Cuban Missile Crisis because of several factors. These included the United States' Strategic Defense Initiative, its planned deployment of the Pershing II weapon system in Europe in March and April, and FleetEx '83-1, the largest naval exercise held to date in the North Pacific. The military hierarchy of the Soviet Union (particularly the old guard led by Soviet General Secretary Yuri Andropov and Minister of Defence Dmitry Ustinov) viewed these actions as bellicose and destabilizing; they were deeply suspicious of U.S. President Ronald Reagan's intentions and openly fearful he was planning a pre-emptive nuclear strike against the Soviet Union. These fears culminated in RYAN, the code name for a secret intelligence-gathering program initiated by Andropov to detect a potential nuclear sneak attack which he believed Reagan was plotting.

On the Soviet side, RYAN was expanded. Lastly, there was a heightened alert around the Kamchatka Peninsula at the time KAL 007 was in the vicinity, because of a Soviet missile test at the Kura Missile Test Range that was scheduled for the same day. A United States Air Force Boeing RC-135 reconnaissance aircraft flying in the area was monitoring the missile test off the peninsula.

At 15:51 UTC, according to Soviet sources, KAL 007 entered the restricted airspace of the Kamchatka Peninsula. The buffer zone extended  from Kamchatka's coast and is known as a flight information region (FIR). The  radius of the buffer zone nearest to Soviet territory had the additional designation of prohibited airspace.

Significant command and control problems were experienced trying to vector the fast military jets onto the 747 before they ran out of fuel. In addition, the pursuit was made more difficult, according to Soviet Air Force Captain Aleksandr Zuyev, who defected to the West in 1989, because, ten days before, Arctic gales had knocked out the key warning radar on the Kamchatka Peninsula. Furthermore, he stated that local officials responsible for repairing the radar lied to Moscow, falsely reporting that they had successfully fixed the radar. Had this radar been operational, it would have enabled an intercept of the stray airliner roughly two hours earlier with plenty of time for proper identification as a civilian aircraft. Instead, the unidentified jetliner crossed over the Kamchatka Peninsula back into international airspace over the Sea of Okhotsk without being intercepted. In his explanation to 60 Minutes, Zuyev stated:

Some people lied to Moscow, trying to save their ass.

The Commander of the Soviet Far East District Air Defense Forces, General Valeri Kamensky, was adamant that KAL 007 was to be destroyed even over neutral waters but only after positive identification showed it not to be a passenger plane. His subordinate, General Anatoly Kornukov, commander of Sokol Air Base and later to become commander of the Russian Air Force, insisted that there was no need to make positive identification as the intruder aircraft had already flown over the Kamchatka Peninsula.

General Kornukov (to Military District Headquarters-Gen. Kamensky): (5:47) "...simply destroy [it] even if it is over neutral waters? Are the orders to destroy it over neutral waters? Oh, well."
Kamensky: "We must find out, maybe it is some civilian craft or God knows who."
Kornukov: "What civilian? [It] has flown over Kamchatka! It [came] from the ocean without identification. I am giving the order to attack if it crosses the State border."

Units of the Soviet Air Defence Forces that had been tracking the South Korean aircraft for more than an hour while it entered and left Soviet airspace now classified the aircraft as a military target when it re-entered their airspace over Sakhalin. After a protracted ground-controlled interception, the three Su-15 fighters (from nearby Dolinsk-Sokol airbase) and the MiG-23 (from Smirnykh Air Base) managed to make visual contact with the Boeing, but, owing to the black of night, failed to make critical identification of the aircraft which Russian communications reveal. The pilot of the lead Su-15 fighter fired warning shots with its cannon, but recalled later in 1991, "I fired four bursts, more than 200 rounds. For all the good it did. After all, I was loaded with armor-piercing shells, not incendiary shells. It's doubtful whether anyone could see them."

At this point, KAL 007 contacted Tokyo Area Control Center, requesting clearance to ascend to a higher flight level for reasons of fuel economy; the request was granted, so the Boeing started to climb, gradually slowing as it exchanged speed for altitude. The decrease in speed caused the pursuing fighter to overshoot the Boeing and was interpreted by the Soviet pilot as an evasive maneuver. The order to shoot KAL 007 down was given as it was about to leave Soviet airspace for the second time. At around 18:26 UTC, under pressure from General Kornukov and ground controllers not to let the aircraft escape into international airspace, the lead fighter was able to move back into a position where it could fire two K-8 (NATO reporting name: AA-3 "Anab") air-to-air missiles at the plane.

Soviet pilot's recollection of shoot-down
In a 1991 interview with Izvestia, Major Gennadiy Osipovich, pilot of the Su-15 interceptor that shot the 747 down, spoke about his recollections of the events leading up to the shoot-down. Contrary to official Soviet statements at the time, he recalled telling ground controllers that there were "blinking lights". He continued, saying of the 747-230B, "I saw two rows of windows and knew that this was a Boeing. I knew this was a civilian plane. But for me this meant nothing. It is easy to turn a civilian type of plane into one for military use." Osipovich stated, "I did not tell the ground that it was a Boeing-type plane; they did not ask me."

Commenting on the moment that KAL 007 slowed as it ascended from flight level 330 to flight level 350, and then on his maneuvering for a missile launch, Osipovich said:

Osipovich died on September 23, 2015, after a protracted illness.

Soviet command hierarchy of shoot-down
The Soviet real-time military communication transcripts of the shoot-down suggest the chain of command from the top general to Major Osipovich, the Su-15 interceptor pilot who shot down KAL 007. In reverse order, they are:

 Major Gennadiy Nikolayevich Osipovich,
 Captain Titovnin, Combat Control Center – Fighter Division
 Lt. Colonel Maistrenko, Smirnykh Air Base Fighter Division Acting Chief of Staff, who confirmed the shoot-down order to Titovnin

 "Titovnin: You confirm the task?
 "Maistrenko: Yes."

 Lt. Colonel Gerasimenko, Acting Commander, 41st Fighter Regiment.

 "Gerasimenko: (to Kornukov) Task received. Destroy target 60–65 with missile fire. Accept control of fighter from Smirnikh."

 General Anatoly Kornukov, Commander of Sokol Air Base – Sakhalin.

 "Kornukov: (to Gerasimenko) I repeat the task, Fire the missiles, Fire on target 60–65. Destroy target 60–65... Take control of the MiG 23 from Smirnikh, call sign 163, call sign 163. He is behind the target at the moment. Destroy the target!... Carry out the task! Destroy it!"

 General Valery Kamensky, Commander of Far East Military District Air Defense Forces.

 "Kornukov: (To Kamensky) ... simply destroy [it] even if it is over neutral waters? Are the orders to destroy it over neutral waters? Oh, well."

 Army General Ivan Moiseevich Tretyak, Commander of the Far East Military District.

 "Weapons were used, weapons authorized at the highest level. Ivan Moiseevich authorized it. Hello, hello.", "Say again.", "I cannot hear you clearly now.", "He gave the order. Hello, hello, hello.", "Yes, yes.", "Ivan Moiseevich gave the order, Tretyak.", "Roger, roger.", "Weapons were used at his order."

Post-attack flight
Tapes recovered from the airliner's cockpit voice recorder indicate that the crew was unaware that they were off course and violating Soviet airspace. Immediately after missile detonation, the airliner began a 113-second arc upward because of a damaged crossover cable between the left inboard and right outboard elevators.

At 18:26:46 UTC (03:26 Japan Time; 06:26 Sakhalin time), at the apex of the arc at altitude , the autopilot disengaged (this was either done by the pilots, or it disengaged automatically). From 18:27:01 until 18:27:09, the flight crew reported to Tokyo Area Control Center informing that KAL 007 would "descend to 10,000" [feet; 3,000m].

Yaw oscillations, beginning at the time of missile detonation, continued decreasingly until the end of the 1-minute 44-second section of the tape. It continued at this altitude for almost five more minutes (18:35 UTC).

The last cockpit voice recorder entry occurred at 18:27:46 while in this phase of the descent. At 18:28 UTC, the aircraft was reported turning to the north. ICAO analysis concluded that the flight crew "retained limited control" of the aircraft. However, this lasted for only five minutes. The crew then lost all control. The aircraft then broke apart in mid-air and crashed into the ocean, just off the West coast of the Sakhalin Island. All 269 people on board were killed. The aircraft was last seen visually by Osipovich, "somehow descending slowly" over Moneron Island.

Initial reports that the airliner had been forced to land on Sakhalin were soon proven false. One of these reports conveyed via phone by Orville Brockman, the Washington office spokesman of the Federal Aviation Administration, to the press secretary of Larry McDonald, was that the FAA in Tokyo had been informed by the Japanese Civil Aviation Bureau that "Japanese self-defense force radar confirms that the Hokkaido radar followed Air Korea to a landing in Soviet territory on the island of Sakhalinska and it is confirmed by the manifest that Congressman McDonald is on board".

A Japanese fisherman aboard 58th Chidori Maru later reported to the Japanese Maritime Safety Agency (this report was cited by ICAO analysis) that he had heard a plane at low altitude, but had not seen it. Then he heard "a loud sound followed by a bright flash of light on the horizon, then another dull sound and a less intense flash of light on the horizon" and smelled aviation fuel.

Soviet command response to post-detonation flight
Though the interceptor pilot reported to ground control, "Target destroyed", the Soviet command, from general on down, indicated surprise and consternation at KAL 007's continued flight, and ability to regain its altitude and maneuver. This consternation continued through to KAL 007's subsequent level flight at altitude , and then, after almost five minutes, through its spiral descent over Moneron Island. (See Korean Air Lines Flight 007 transcripts from 18:26 UTC onwards: "Lt. Col. Novoseletski: Well, what is happening? What is the matter? Who guided him in? He locked on; why didn't he shoot it down?")

Missile damage to plane
The following damage to the aircraft was determined by the ICAO from its analysis of the flight data recorder and cockpit voice recorder:

Hydraulics
KAL 007 had four redundant hydraulic systems of which systems one, two, and three were damaged or destroyed. There was no evidence of damage to system four. The hydraulics provided actuation of all primary and secondary flight controls (except leading edge slats in the latter) as well as landing gear retraction, extension, gear steering, and wheel braking. Each primary flight control axis received power from all four hydraulic systems. Upon missile detonation, the jumbo jet began to experience oscillations (yawing) as the dual channel yaw damper was damaged. Yawing would not have occurred if hydraulic systems one or two were fully operational. This failure of the autopilot to correct the rise in altitude indicates that hydraulic system number three, which operates the autopilot actuator, a system controlling the plane's elevators, was damaged or out. KAL 007's airspeed and acceleration rate both began to decrease as the plane began to climb. At twenty seconds after the missile detonation, a click was heard in the cabin, which is identified as the "automatic pilot disconnect warning" sound. Either the pilot or co-pilot had disconnected the autopilot and was manually thrusting the control column forward in order to bring the plane lower. Though the autopilot had been turned off, manual mode did not begin functioning for another twenty seconds. This failure of the manual system to engage upon command indicates failure in hydraulic systems one and two. With wing flaps up, "control was reduced to the right inboard aileron and the innermost of spoiler section of each side".

Left wing
Contrary to Major Osipovich's statement in 1991 that he had taken off half of KAL 007's left wing, ICAO analysis found that the wing was intact: "The interceptor pilot stated that the first missile hit near the tail, while the second missile took off half the left wing of the aircraft... The interceptor's pilot's statement that the second missile took off half of the left wing was probably incorrect. The missiles were fired at a two-second interval and would have detonated at an equal interval. The first detonated at 18:26:02 UTC. The last radio transmissions from KE007 to Tokyo Radio were between 18:26:57 and 18:27:15 UTC using HF [high frequency]. The HF 1 radio aerial of the aircraft was positioned in the left wing tip suggesting that the left wing tip was intact at this time. Also, the aircraft's maneuvers after the attack did not indicate extensive damage to the left wing."

Engines
The co-pilot reported to Captain Chun twice during the flight after the missiles' detonation, "Engines normal, sir."

Tail section
The first missile was radar-controlled and proximity fuzed, and detonated  behind the aircraft. Sending fragments forward, it either severed or unraveled the crossover cable from the left inboard elevator to the right elevator.

Fuselage
Fragments from the proximity fuzed air-to-air missile that detonated  behind the aircraft, punctured the fuselage and caused rapid decompression of the pressurised cabin.

Search and rescue
As a result of Cold War tensions, the search and rescue operations of the Soviet Union were not coordinated with those of the United States, South Korea, and Japan. Consequently, no information was shared, and each side endeavored to harass or obtain evidence to implicate the other. The flight data recorders were the key pieces of evidence sought by both governments, with the United States insisting that an independent observer from the ICAO be present on one of its search vessels in the event that they were found. International boundaries are not well defined on the open sea, leading to numerous confrontations between the large number of opposing naval ships that were assembled in the area.

Soviet search and rescue mission to Moneron Island
The Soviets did not acknowledge shooting down the aircraft until September 6, five days after the flight was shot down. Eight days after the shoot-down, Marshal of the Soviet Union and Chief of General Staff Nikolai Ogarkov denied knowledge of where KAL 007 had gone down; "We could not give the precise answer about the spot where it [KAL 007] fell because we ourselves did not know the spot in the first place."

Nine years later, the Russian Federation handed over transcripts of Soviet military communications that showed that at least two documented search and rescue (SAR) missions were ordered within a half-hour of the attack, to the last Soviet verified location of the descending jumbo jet over Moneron Island. The first search was ordered from Smirnykh Air Base in central Sakhalin at 18:47 UTC, nine minutes after KAL 007 had disappeared from Soviet radar screens and brought rescue helicopters from Khomutovo Air Base (the military unit at Yuzhno-Sakhalinsk Airport in southern Sakhalin), and Soviet Border Troops boats to the area.

The second search was ordered eight minutes later by the Deputy Commander of the Far Eastern Military District, General Strogov, and involved civilian trawlers that were in the area around Moneron. "The border guards. What ships do we now have near Moneron Island? If they are civilians, send [them] there immediately."

Search for KAL 007 in international waters

Immediately after the shoot-down, South Korea, the owner of the aircraft and therefore prime considerant for jurisdiction, designated the United States and Japan as search and salvage agents, thereby making it illegal for the Soviet Union to salvage the aircraft, providing it was found outside Soviet territorial waters. If it did so, the United States would now be legally entitled to use force against the Soviets, if necessary, to prevent retrieval of any part of the plane.

A surface search began immediately and on into September 13. U.S. underwater operations began on September 14. On September 10, 1983, with no further hope of finding survivors, Task Force 71's mission was reclassified from a "Search and Rescue" (SAR) operation to a "Search and Salvage" (SAS).

On October 17, Rear Admiral Walter T. Piotti, Jr. took command of the task force and its search and salvage mission from Rear Admiral Cockell. First to be searched was a  "high probability" area. This was unsuccessful. This was the "large probability" area. The search areas were outside the  Soviet-claimed territorial boundaries. The northwesternmost point of the search touched the Soviet territorial boundary closest to the naval port of Nevelsk on Sakhalin. This larger search was also unsuccessful.

The vessels used in the search, for the Soviet side as well as the US side (US, South Korea, Japan) were both civilian trawlers, specially equipped for both the SAR and SAS operations, and various types of warships and support ships. The Soviet side also employed both civilian and military divers. The Soviet search, beginning on the day of the shoot-down and continuing until November 6, was confined to the  "high probability" area in international waters, and within Soviet territorial waters to the north of Moneron Island. The area within Soviet territorial waters was off-limits to the U.S., South Korean, and Japanese boats. From September 3 to 29, four ships from South Korea joined in the search.

Piotti Jr, commander of Task Force 71 of the 7th Fleet would summarize the US and Allied, and then the Soviets', Search and Salvage operations:

Piotti Jr, commander of Task Force 71 of 7th Fleet, believed the search for KAL 007 in international waters to have been a search in the wrong place and assessed:

Had TF [task force] 71 been permitted to search without restriction imposed by claimed territorial waters, the aircraft stood a good chance of having been found. No wreckage of KAL 007 was found. However, the operation established, with a 95% or above confidence level, that the wreckage, or any significant portion of the aircraft, does not lie within the probability area outside the 12 nautical mile area claimed by the Soviets as their territorial limit.

At a hearing of the ICAO on September 15, 1983, J. Lynn Helms, the head of the Federal Aviation Administration, stated: "The USSR has refused to permit search and rescue units from other countries to enter Soviet territorial waters to search for the remains of KAL 007. Moreover, the Soviet Union has blocked access to the likely crash site and has refused to cooperate with other interested parties, to ensure prompt recovery of all technical equipment, wreckage, and other material."

Human remains and artifacts

Surface finds

No body parts were recovered by the Soviet search team from the surface of the sea in their territorial waters, though they would later turn over clothes and shoes to a joint U.S.–Japanese delegation at Nevelsk on Sakhalin. On Monday, September 26, 1983, a delegation of seven Japanese and U.S. officials arriving aboard the Japanese patrol boat Tsugaru, had met a six-man Soviet delegation at the port of Nevelsk on Sakhalin Island. KGB Major General A. I. Romanenko, the Commander of the Sakhalin and Kuril Islands frontier guard, headed the Soviet delegation. Romanenko handed over to the U.S. and the Japanese, among other things, single and paired footwear. With footwear that the Japanese also retrieved, the total came to 213 men's, women's, and children's dress shoes, sandals, and sports shoes. The Soviets indicated these items were all that they had retrieved floating or on the shores of Sakhalin and Moneron islands.

Family members of KAL 007 passengers later stated that these shoes were worn by their loved ones for the flight. Sonia Munder had no difficulty recognizing the sneakers of her children, one from Christian, age 14, and one from Lisi, age 17, by the intricate way her children laced them. Another mother says, "I recognized them just like that. You see, there are all kinds of inconspicuous marks that strangers do not notice. This is how I recognized them. My daughter loved to wear them."

Another mother, Nan Oldham, identified her son John's sneakers from a photo in Life magazine of 55 of the 213 shoes—apparently a random array on display those first days at Chitose Air Force Base in Japan. "We saw photos of his shoes in a magazine," says Oldham, "We followed up through KAL and a few weeks later, a package arrived. His shoes were inside: size 11 sneakers with cream white paint." John Oldham had taken his seat in row 31 of KAL 007 wearing those cream white paint-spattered sneakers.

Nothing was found by the joint U.S.–Japanese–South Korean search and rescue/salvage operations in international waters at the designated crash site or within the  search area.

Hokkaido finds
Eight days after the shoot-down, human remains and other types of objects appeared on the north shore of Hokkaido, Japan. The ICAO concluded that these bodies, body parts, and objects were carried from Soviet waters to the shores of Hokkaido by the southerly current west of Sakhalin Island. All currents of the Strait of Tartary relevant to Moneron Island flow to the north, except this southerly current between Moneron Island and Sakhalin Island.

These human remains, including body parts, tissues, and two partial torsos, totaled 13. All were unidentifiable, but one partial torso was that of a Caucasian woman as indicated by auburn hair on a partial skull, and one partial body was of an Asian child (with glass embedded). There was no luggage recovered. Of the non-human remains that the Japanese recovered were various items including dentures, newspapers, seats, books, eight KAL paper cups, shoes, sandals, and sneakers, a camera case, a "please fasten seat belt" sign, an oxygen mask, a handbag, a bottle of dishwashing fluid, several blouses, an identity card belonging to 25-year-old passenger Mary Jane Hendrie of Sault Ste. Marie, Ontario, Canada, and the business cards of passengers Kathy Brown-Spier and Mason Chang. These items generally came from the passenger cabin of the aircraft. None of the items found generally came from the cargo hold of the plane, such as suitcases, packing boxes, industrial machinery, instruments, and sports equipment.

Russian diver reports

In 1991, after the collapse of the Soviet Union, the Russian newspaper Izvestia published a series of interviews with Soviet military personnel who had been involved in salvage operations to find and recover parts of the aircraft. After three days of searching using trawlers, side-scan sonar, and diving bells, Soviet searchers located the aircraft wreckage at a depth of  near Moneron Island. Since no human remains or luggage were found on the surface in the impact area, the divers expected to find the remains of passengers who had been trapped in the submerged wreckage of the aircraft on the seabed. When they visited the site two weeks after the shoot-down, they found that the wreckage was in small pieces, and found no bodies:

I had the idea that it would be intact. Well, perhaps a little banged up... The divers would go inside the aircraft and see everything there was to see. In fact, it was completely demolished, scattered about like kindling. The largest things we saw were the braces which are especially strong—they were about one and a half or two meters long and 50–60 centimeters wide. As for the rest—broken into tiny pieces...

According to Izvestia, the divers had only ten encounters with passenger remains (tissues and body parts) in the debris area, including one partial torso.

Tinro ll submersible Captain Mikhail Igorevich Girs' diary: Submergence 10 October. Aircraft pieces, wing spars, pieces of aircraft skin, wiring, and clothing. But—no people. The impression is that all of this has been dragged here by a trawl rather than falling down from the sky...

Vyacheslav Popov: "I will confess that we felt great relief when we found out that there were no bodies at the bottom. Not only were no bodies; there were also no suitcases or large bags. I did not miss a single dive. I have quite a clear impression: The aircraft was filled with garbage, but there were really no people there. Why? Usually when an aircraft crashes, even a small one... As a rule, there are suitcases and bags, or at least the handles of the suitcases."

A number of civilian divers, whose first dive was on September 15, two weeks after the shoot-down, state that Soviet military divers and trawls had been at work before them:

Diver Vyacheslav Popov: "As we learned then, before us the trawlers had done some 'work' in the designated quadrant. It is hard to understand what sense the military saw in the trawling operation. First, drag everything haphazardly around the bottom by the trawls, and then send in the submersibles?...It is clear that things should have been done in the reverse order."

ICAO also interviewed a number of these divers for its 1993 report: "In addition to the scraps of metal, they observed personal items, such as clothing, documents, and wallets. Although some evidence of human remains was noticed by the divers, they found no bodies."

Political events

Initial Soviet denial

General Secretary Yuri Andropov, on the advice of Defense Minister Dmitriy Ustinov, but against the advice of the Foreign Ministry, initially decided not to make any admission of downing the airliner, on the premise that no one would find out or be able to prove otherwise. Consequently the TASS news agency reported twelve hours after the shoot-down only that an unidentified aircraft, flying without lights, had been intercepted by Soviet fighters after it violated Soviet airspace over Sakhalin. The aircraft had allegedly failed to respond to warnings and "continued its flight toward the Sea of Japan". Some commentators believe that the inept manner in which the political events were handled by the Soviet government was affected by the failing health of Andropov, who was permanently hospitalised in late September or early October 1983 (Andropov died the following February).

In a 2015 interview Igor Kirillov, the senior Soviet news anchor said that he was initially given a printed TASS report to announce over the news on September 1, which included an "open and honest" admission that the plane was shot down by mistake (a wrong judgment call by the Far Eastern Air Defence Command). However, at the moment the opening credits of the Vremya evening news programme rolled in, an editor ran in and snatched the sheet of paper from his hand, handing him another TASS report which was "completely opposite" to the first one and to the truth.

U.S. reaction and further developments

The shoot-down happened at a very tense time in the U.S.–Soviet relations during the Cold War. The U.S. adopted a strategy of releasing a substantial amount of hitherto highly classified intelligence information in order to exploit a major propaganda advantage over the Soviet Union.

Six hours after the plane was downed, the South Korean government issued an announcement that the plane had merely been forced to land abruptly by the Soviets and that all passengers and crew were safe. U.S. Secretary of State George P. Shultz held a press conference about the incident at 10:45 on September 1, during which he divulged some details of intercepted Soviet communications and denounced the actions of the Soviet Union.

On September 5, 1983, President Reagan condemned the shooting down of the airplane as the "Korean airline massacre", a "crime against humanity [that] must never be forgotten" and an "act of barbarism... [and] inhuman brutality". The following day, the U.S. ambassador to the UN Jeane Kirkpatrick delivered an audio-visual presentation in the United Nations Security Council, using audio tapes of the Soviet pilots' radio conversations and a map of Flight 007's path in depicting its shooting down. Following this presentation, TASS acknowledged for the first time that the aircraft had indeed been shot down after warnings were ignored. The Soviets challenged many of the facts presented by the U.S. and revealed the previously unknown presence of a USAF RC-135 surveillance aircraft whose path had crossed that of KAL 007.

On September 7, Japan and the United States jointly released a transcript of Soviet communications, intercepted by the listening post at Wakkanai, to an emergency session of the United Nations Security Council. Reagan issued a National Security Directive stating that the Soviets were not to be let off the hook, and initiating "a major diplomatic effort to keep international and domestic attention focused on the Soviet action". The move was seen by the Soviet leadership as confirmation of the West's bad intentions.

A high-level U.S.–Soviet summit, the first in nearly a year, was scheduled for September 8, 1983, in Madrid. The Shultz–Gromyko meeting went ahead but was overshadowed by the KAL 007 events. It ended acrimoniously, with Shultz stating: "Foreign Minister Gromyko's response to me today was even more unsatisfactory than the response he gave in public yesterday. I find it totally unacceptable." Reagan ordered the Federal Aviation Administration (FAA) on September 15, 1983, to revoke the license of Aeroflot Soviet Airlines to operate flights to and from the United States. Aeroflot flights to North America were consequently available only through Canadian and Mexican cities, forcing the Soviet foreign minister to cancel his scheduled trip to the UN. Aeroflot service to the U.S. was not restored until April 29, 1986.

An emergency session of the ICAO was held in Montreal, Canada. On September 12, 1983, the Soviet Union used its veto to block a United Nations resolution condemning it for shooting down the aircraft.

Shortly after the Soviet Union shot down KAL 007, the Port Authority of New York and New Jersey, operating the commercial airports around New York City, denied Soviet aircraft landing rights, in violation of the United Nations Charter that required the host nation to allow all member countries access to the UN. In reaction, TASS and some at the UN raised the question of whether the UN should move its headquarters from the United States. Charles Lichenstein, acting U.S. permanent representative to the UN under Ambassador Kirkpatrick, responded, "We will put no impediment in your way. The members of the U.S. mission to the United Nations will be down at the dockside waving you a fond farewell as you sail off into the sunset." Administration officials were quick to announce that Lichenstein was speaking only for himself.

In the Cold War context of Operation RYAN, the Strategic Defence Initiative, Pershing II missile deployment in Europe, and the upcoming Exercise Able Archer, the Soviet Government perceived the incident with the South Korean airliner to be a portent of war. The Soviet hierarchy took the official line that KAL Flight 007 was on a spy mission, as it "flew deep into Soviet territory for several hundred kilometres [miles], without responding to signals and disobeying the orders of interceptor fighter planes". They claimed its purpose was to probe the air defences of highly sensitive Soviet military sites in the Kamchatka Peninsula and Sakhalin Island. The Soviet government expressed regret over the loss of life, but offered no apology and did not respond to demands for compensation. Instead, the Soviet Union blamed the CIA for this "criminal, provocative act".

In a comparative study of the two tragedies published in 1991, political scientist Robert Entman points out that with KAL 007, "the angle taken by the US media emphasised the moral bankruptcy and guilt of the perpetrating nation. With Iran Air 655, the frame de-emphasised guilt and focused on the complex problems of operating military high technology".

Investigations

NTSB
Since the aircraft had departed from U.S. soil and U.S. nationals had died in the incident, the National Transportation Safety Board (NTSB) was legally required to investigate. On the morning of September 1, the NTSB chief in Alaska, James Michelangelo, received an order from the NTSB in Washington at the behest of the State Department requiring all documents relating to the NTSB investigation to be sent to Washington and notifying him that the State Department would now conduct the investigation.

The U.S. State Department, after closing the NTSB investigation on the grounds that it was not an accident, pursued an ICAO investigation instead. Commentators such as Johnson point out that this action was illegal, and that in deferring the investigation to the ICAO, the Reagan administration effectively precluded any politically or militarily sensitive information from being subpoenaed that might have embarrassed the administration or contradicted its version of events. Unlike the NTSB, ICAO can subpoena neither persons nor documents and is dependent on the governments involved—in this incident, the United States, the Soviet Union, Japan, and South Korea—to supply evidence voluntarily.

Initial ICAO investigation (1983)
The International Civil Aviation Organization (ICAO) had only one experience of investigation of an air disaster before the KAL 007 shoot-down. This was the incident of February 21, 1973, when Libyan Arab Airlines Flight 114 was shot down by Israeli F-4 jets over the Sinai Peninsula. ICAO convention required the state in whose territory the incident had taken place (the Soviet Union) to conduct an investigation together with the country of registration (South Korea), the country whose air traffic control the aircraft was flying under (Japan), as well as the country of the aircraft's manufacturer (US).

The ICAO investigation, led by Caj Frostell, did not have the authority to compel the states involved to hand over evidence, instead having to rely on what they voluntarily submitted. Consequently, the investigation did not have access to sensitive evidence such as radar data, intercepts, ATC tapes, or the Flight Data Recorder (FDR) and Cockpit Voice Recorder (CVR) (whose discovery the U.S.S.R. had kept secret). A number of simulations were conducted with the assistance of Boeing and Litton (the manufacturer of the navigation system).

The ICAO released their report on December 2, 1983, which concluded that the violation of Soviet airspace was accidental: One of two explanations for the aircraft's deviation was that the autopilot had remained in HEADING hold instead of INS mode after departing Anchorage. They postulated that this inflight navigational error was caused by either the crew's failure to select INS mode or the inertial navigation not activating when selected because the aircraft was already too far off track. It was determined that the crew did not notice this error or subsequently perform navigational checks, which would have revealed that the aircraft was diverging further and further from its assigned route. This was later deemed to be caused by a "lack of situational awareness and flight deck coordination".

The report included a statement by the Soviet Government claiming "no remains of the victims, the instruments or their components or the flight recorders have so far been discovered". This statement was subsequently shown to be untrue by Boris Yeltsin's release in 1993 of a November 1983 memo from KGB head Viktor Chebrikov and Defence Minister Dmitriy Ustinov to Yuri Andropov. This memo stated, "In the third decade of October this year the equipment in question (the recorder of in-flight parameters and the recorder of voice communications by the flight crew with ground air traffic surveillance stations and between themselves) was brought aboard a search vessel and forwarded to Moscow by air for decoding and translation at the Air Force Scientific Research Institute." The Soviet Government statement would further be contradicted by Soviet civilian divers who later recalled that they viewed the wreckage of the aircraft on the bottom of the sea for the first time on September 15, two weeks after the plane had been shot down.

Following the publication of the report, the ICAO adopted a resolution condemning the Soviet Union for the attack. Furthermore, the report led to a unanimous amendment in May 1984—though not coming into force until October 1, 1998—to the Convention on International Civil Aviation that defined the use of force against civilian airliners in more detail. The amendment to section 3(d) reads in part: "The contracting States recognize that every State must refrain from resorting to the use of weapons against civil aircraft in flight and that, in case of interception, the lives of persons on board and the safety of aircraft must not be endangered."

U.S. Air Force radar data
It is customary for the Air Force to impound radar trackings involving possible litigation in cases of aviation accidents. In the civil litigation for damages, the United States Department of Justice explained that the tapes from the Air Force radar installation at King Salmon, Alaska, pertinent to KAL 007's flight in the Bethel area had been destroyed and could therefore not be supplied to the plaintiffs. At first Justice Department lawyer Jan Van Flatern stated that they were destroyed 15 days after the shoot-down. Later, he said he had "misspoken" and changed the time of destruction to 30 hours after the event. A Pentagon spokesman concurred, saying that the tapes are recycled for re-use from 24–30 hours afterward; the fate of KAL 007 was known inside this timeframe.

Interim developments

Hans Ephraimson-Abt, whose daughter Alice Ephraimson-Abt had died on the flight, chaired the American Association for Families of KAL 007 Victims. He single-handedly pursued three U.S. administrations for answers about the flight, flying to Washington 250 times and meeting with 149 State Department officials. Following the dissolution of the U.S.S.R., Ephraimson-Abt persuaded U.S. Senators Ted Kennedy, Sam Nunn, Carl Levin, and Bill Bradley to write to the Soviet President, Mikhail Gorbachev requesting information about the flight.

Glasnost reforms in the same year brought about a relaxation of press censorship; consequently reports started to appear in the Soviet press suggesting that the Soviet military knew the location of the wreckage and had possession of the flight data recorders. On December 10, 1991, Senator Jesse Helms of the Committee on Foreign Relations, wrote to Boris Yeltsin requesting information concerning the survival of passengers and crew of KAL 007 including the fate of Congressman Larry McDonald.

On June 17, 1992, President Yeltsin revealed that after the 1991 failed coup attempt concerted attempts were made to locate Soviet-era documents relating to KAL 007. He mentioned the discovery of "a memorandum from K.G.B. to the Central Committee of the Communist Party," stating that a tragedy had taken place and adding that there are documents "which would clarify the entire picture." Yeltsin said the memo continued to say that "these documents are so well concealed that it is doubtful that our children will be able to find them." On September 11, 1992, Yeltsin officially acknowledged the existence of the recorders and promised to give the South Korean government a transcript of the flight recorder contents as found in KGB files.

In October 1992, Hans Ephraimson-Abt led a delegation of families and U.S. State Department officials to Moscow at the invitation of President Yeltsin. During a state ceremony at St. Catherine's Hall in the Kremlin, the KAL family delegation was handed a portfolio containing partial transcripts of the KAL 007 cockpit voice recorder, translated into Russian, and documents of the Politburo pertaining to the tragedy.

In November 1992, President Yeltsin handed the two recorder containers to Korean President Roh Tae-Woo, but not the tapes themselves. The following month, the ICAO voted to reopen the KAL 007 investigations in order to take the newly released information into account. The tapes were handed to ICAO in Paris on January 8, 1993. Also handed over at the same time were tapes of the ground-to-air communications of the Soviet military. The tapes were transcribed by the Bureau d'Enquêtes et d'Analyses pour la sécurité de l'Aviation Civile (BEA) in Paris in the presence of representatives from Japan, The Russian Federation, South Korea, and the United States.

A 1993 official enquiry by the Russian Federation absolved the Soviet hierarchy of blame, determining that the incident was a case of mistaken identity. On May 28, 1993, the ICAO presented its second report to the Secretary-General of the United Nations.

Soviet memoranda

In 1992, Russian President Boris Yeltsin disclosed five top-secret memos dating from a few weeks after the downing of KAL 007 in 1983. The memos contained Soviet communications (from KGB Chief Viktor Chebrikov and Defense Minister Dmitriy Ustinov to General Secretary Yury Andropov) that indicated that they knew the location of KAL 007's wreckage while they were simulating a search and harassing the American Navy; they had found the sought-after cockpit voice recorder on October 20, 1983 (50 days after the incident), and had decided to keep this knowledge secret, the reason being that the tapes could not unequivocally support their firmly held view that KAL 007's flight to Soviet territory was a deliberately planned intelligence mission.

The third memo acknowledges that analysis of the recorder tapes showed no evidence of the Soviet interceptor attempting to contact KAL 007 via radio nor any indication that the KAL 007 had been given warning shots.

However in case the flight recorders shall become available to the western countries their data may be used for Confirmation of no attempt by the intercepting aircraft to establish radio contact with the intruder plane on 121.5 MHz and no tracers warning shots in the last section of the flight

That the Soviet search was simulated (while they knew the wreckage lay elsewhere) also is suggested by the article of Mikhail Prozumentshchikov, Deputy Director of the Russian State Archives of Recent History, commemorating the twentieth anniversary of the airplane's shoot-down. Commenting on the Soviet and American searches: "Since the U.S.S.R., for natural reasons, knew better where the Boeing had been downed...it was very problematical to retrieve anything, especially as the U.S.S.R. was not particularly interested".

Revised ICAO report (1993)
On November 18, 1992, Russian President Boris Yeltsin, in a goodwill gesture to South Korea during a visit to Seoul to ratify a new treaty, released both the flight data recorder (FDR) and cockpit voice recorder (CVR) of KAL 007. Initial South Korean research showed the FDR to be empty and the CVR to have an unintelligible copy. The Russians then released the recordings to the ICAO Secretary General. The ICAO report continued to support the initial assertion that KAL 007 accidentally flew in Soviet airspace, after listening to the flight crew's conversations recorded by the CVR, and confirming that either the aircraft had flown on a constant magnetic heading instead of activating the INS and following its assigned waypoints, or, if it had activated the INS, it had been activated when the aircraft had already deviated beyond the 7-nautical mile Desired Track Envelope within which the waypoints would have been captured.

In addition, the Russian Federation released "Transcript of Communications. U.S.S.R. Air Defence Command Centres on Sakhalin Island" transcripts to ICAO—this new evidence triggered the revised ICAO report in 1993 "The Report of the Completion of the Fact-Finding Investigation", and is appended to it. These transcripts (of two reels of tape, each containing multiple tracks) are time specified, some to the second, of the communications between the various command posts and other military facilities on Sakhalin from the time of the initial orders for the shoot-down and then through the stalking of KAL 007 by Major Osipovich in his Su-15 interceptor, the attack as seen and commented on by General Kornukov, Commander of Sokol Air Base, down the ranks to the Combat Controller Captain Titovnin.

The transcripts include the post-attack flight of KAL 007 until it had reached Moneron Island, the descent of KAL 007 over Moneron, the initial Soviet SAR missions to Moneron, the futile search of the support interceptors for KAL 007 on the water, and ending with the debriefing of Osipovich on return to base. Some of the communications are the telephone conversations between superior officers and subordinates and involve commands to them, while other communications involve the recorded responses to what was then being viewed on radar tracking KAL 007. These multi-track communications from various command posts telecommunicating at the same minute and seconds as other command posts were communicating provide a "composite" picture of what was taking place.

The data from the CVR and the FDR revealed that the recordings broke off after the first minute and 44 seconds of KAL 007's post-missile detonation 12 minute flight. The remaining minutes of the flight would be supplied by the Russia 1992 submission to ICAO of the real-time Soviet military communication of the shoot-down and aftermath. The fact that both recorder tapes stopped exactly at the same time 1 minute and 44 seconds after missile detonation (18:38:02 UTC) without the tape portions for the more than 10 minutes of KAL 007's post-detonation flight before it descended below radar tracking (18:38 UTC) finds no explanation in the ICAO analysis: "It could not be established why both flight recorders simultaneously ceased to operate 104 seconds after the attack. The power supply cables were fed to the rear of the aircraft in raceways on opposite sides of the fuselage until they came together behind the two recorders."

Passenger pain and suffering
Passenger pain and suffering was an important factor in determining the level of compensation that was paid by Korean Air Lines.

Fragments from the proximity fused R-98 medium range air-to-air missile exploding  behind the tail caused punctures to the pressurized passenger cabin. When one of the flight crew radioed Tokyo Area Control one minute and two seconds after missile detonation his breathing was already "accentuated", indicating to ICAO analysts that he was speaking through the microphone located in his oxygen mask, "Korean Air 007 ah... We are... Rapid compressions. Descend to 10,000."

Two expert witnesses testified at a trial before then Magistrate Judge Naomi Reice Buchwald of the United States District Court for the Southern District of New York. They addressed the issue of pre-death pain and suffering. Captain James McIntyre, an experienced Boeing 747 pilot, and aircraft accident investigator, testified that shrapnel from the missile caused rapid decompression of the cabin, but left the passengers sufficient time to don oxygen masks: "McIntyre testified that, based upon his estimate of the extent of damage the aircraft sustained, all passengers survived the initial impact of the shrapnel from the missile explosion. In McIntyre's expert opinion, at least 12 minutes elapsed between the impact of the shrapnel and the crash of the plane, and the passengers remained conscious throughout."

Alternative theories

Flight 007 has been the subject of ongoing controversy and has spawned a number of conspiracy theories. Many of these are based on the suppression of evidence such as the flight data recorders, unexplained details such as the role of a USAF RC-135 surveillance aircraft, the untimely destruction of the U.S. Air Force's King Salmon radar data, Cold War disinformation and propaganda and Gennadiy Osipovich's (the Soviet fighter pilot who shot down flight 007) statement that although he knew the plane was a civilian aircraft, he suspected that it could have been being used as a spy plane.

Aftermath

Two television movies were produced about the incident; both films were produced before the fall of the Soviet Union allowed access to archives. Shootdown (1988), a telemovie starring Angela Lansbury, John Cullum, and Kyle Secor, was based on the book of the same title by R.W. Johnson, about the efforts of Nan Moore (Lansbury), the mother of a passenger, to get answers from the U.S. and Soviet governments. Then the British Granada Television documentary drama Coded Hostile, screened on ITV on September 7, 1989, detailed the U.S. military and governmental investigation, highlighting the likely confusion of Flight 007 with the USAF RC-135 in the context of routine US SIGINT/COMINT missions in the area. Written by Brian Phelan and directed by David Darlow, it starred Michael Murphy, Michael Moriarty, and Chris Sarandon. An updated version was screened by Channel 4 in the UK on August 31, 1993, incorporating details of the 1992 UN investigation.

Airway closed
The FAA temporarily closed Airway R-20, the air corridor that Korean Air Flight 007 was meant to follow, on September 2. Airlines fiercely resisted the closure of this popular route, the shortest of five corridors between Alaska and Eastern Asia. It was therefore reopened on October 2 after safety and navigational aids were checked.

NATO had decided, under the impetus of the Reagan administration, to deploy Pershing II and Gryphon cruise missiles in West Germany. This deployment would have placed missiles just 6–10 minutes striking distance from Moscow. Support for the deployment was wavering and it looked doubtful that it would be carried out. When the Soviet Union shot down Flight 007, the U.S. was able to galvanize enough support at home and abroad to enable the deployment to go ahead.

The unprecedented disclosure of the communications intercepted by the United States and Japan revealed a considerable amount of information about their intelligence systems and capabilities. National Security Agency director Lincoln D. Faurer commented: "...as a result of the Korean Air Lines affair, you have already heard more about my business in the past two weeks than I would desire... For the most part, this has not been a matter of unwelcome leaks. It is the result of a conscious, responsible decision to address an otherwise unbelievable horror." Changes that the Soviets subsequently made to their codes and frequencies reduced the effectiveness of this monitoring by 60%.

The U.S. KAL 007 Victims' Association, under the leadership of Hans Ephraimson-Abt, successfully lobbied U.S. Congress and the airline industry to accept an agreement that would ensure that future victims of airline incidents would be compensated quickly and fairly by increasing compensation and lowering the burden of proof of airliner misconduct. This legislation has had far-reaching effects for the victims of subsequent aircraft disasters.

The U.S. decided to utilize military radars to extend air traffic control radar coverage from  out from Anchorage. The FAA also established a secondary radar system (ATCBI-5) on Saint Paul Island. In 1986, the United States, Japan and the Soviet Union set up a joint air traffic control system to monitor aircraft over the North Pacific, thereby giving the Soviet Union formal responsibility to monitor civilian air traffic, and setting up direct communication links between the controllers of the three countries.

On September 16, 1983 a White House press secretary read a statement on the downing of Korean Air Lines Flight 007. It is announced that the GPS system should be available for civil aviation with the planned completion in 1988.  This communication was sometimes understood as the release of the military project for the general public. However, the GPS system was developed from the start for military and civilian navigation. 

The regular air route between Seoul and Moscow started in April 1990 as the result of the Nordpolitik policy of South Korea, operated by Aeroflot and Korean Air; meanwhile, all 9 of Korean Air's European routes would start passing through Soviet airspace. This was the first time Korean Air aircraft was officially permitted to pass through Soviet airspace.

Alvin Snyder, the director of worldwide television for the United States Information Agency, was the producer of the video shown to the U.N. Security Council on September 6, 1983. In an article in The Washington Post on September 1, 1996, he stated that he had been given only limited access to the transcripts of the Soviet communication when he produced the video in 1983. When he received full insight into the Soviet transmissions in 1993, he says he realized that: "The Russians (sic) believed the plane to be an RC-135 reconnaissance plane" and that "Osipovich (the Soviet fighter pilot) could not identify the plane" and "That he fired warning cannon shots and tipped his wings, an international signal to force the plane to land". Some of these statements were contradicted by the pilot in an interview with The New York Times, in which he confirmed that he did fire warning shots, but that they would not have been visible as they were not tracers.

In a March 15, 2001, interview, Valery Kamensky, then Commander of the Soviet Far East Military District Air Defense Force and direct superior to General Kornukov, opined that such a shoot-down of a civilian passenger plane could not happen again in view of the changing political conditions and alliances. In this interview, Kamensky stated, "It is still a mystery what happened to the bodies of the crew and passengers on the plane. According to one theory, right after the detonation of the rocket, the nose and tail section of the jumbo fell off and the mid-fuselage became a sort of wind tunnel so the people were swept through it and scattered over the surface of the ocean. Yet in this case, some of the bodies were to have been found during the search operations in the area. The question of what actually happened to the people has not been given a distinct answer."

On September 1, 2003, commenting on the 20th anniversary of the shoot-down article in RIA Novosti, Mikhail Prozumentshchikov, Deputy Director of the Russian State Archives of Recent History disclosed that the Soviet naval forces in the search for KAL 007 in international waters, already "knew better where [it] had been downed" while conducting their search and that nothing was found "especially as the USSR was not particularly interested."

In 2015, Japan's Ministry of Foreign Affairs declassified diplomatic documents which revealed that two months after the catastrophe, a high-ranking official of the U.S. administration confidentially informed Japan's diplomats that the Soviet Union had mistaken the aircraft for an American reconnaissance plane.

Korean Air still flies from John F. Kennedy International Airport in New York City to Seoul. However, the flight no longer stops at Anchorage or flies to Gimpo International Airport as it now flies directly to Incheon International Airport. Flight number 007 has been retired since, using flight numbers for two separate flights as 82, 85 and 250. , the separate flights were using a Boeing 777 and a Boeing 747-8I.

Popular culture
The American science fiction television drama series For All Mankind, referenced the flight in season 2, episode 7, by adding a fictional passenger to the flight, who was to have been the most senior NASA administration official and was positioned as the root target that led to the downing of the flight, in the show's alternate depiction of how the Space Race could have gone.

In 1989 HBO has released the film TAILSPIN BEHIND THE KOREAN AIRLINER TRAGEDY with Michael Moriarty, Michael Murphy, Chris Sarandon & Harris Yulin about the case of Korean Airlines flight 007

See also
 Cold War (1979–85)
 History of the Soviet Union (1982–91)
 Korean Air Lines Flight 902
 List of airliner shootdown incidents
 List of United States Congress members killed or wounded in office
 Notable decompression accidents and incidents
 Siberia Airlines Flight 1812
 Iran Air Flight 655
 Malaysia Airlines Flight 17
 1983 Soviet nuclear false alarm incident, which happened three weeks later.

Footnotes

Notes

References

Books

Journals

Online sources
 
  This article was adapted from a book chapter, entitled "The Crash of Korean Air Lines Flight 007," which appeared in Degani, A. (2004). Taming HAL: Designing Interfaces Beyond 2001. New York: St. Martin's Press (Palgrave-Macmillan)
 
 
 
 
 
 
 
 .

Further reading
 
 
 Corcoran, Farrel. "KAL 007 and the evil empire: Mediated disaster and forms of rationalization." Critical Studies in Media Communication 3.3 (1986): 297–316.
 
 
 
Maier, Timothy (April 17, 2001). "KAL 007 Mystery." Insight on the News.
 Morgan, Craig A. "The Downing of Korean Air Lines Flight 007." Yale Journal of International Law 11 (1985): 231+ online. 
 
 
 
 
 
 
 Soviet Air Force Transcripts, Airliners.net
 .
 .
 .
 .
 
 
 FBI files on KAL 007 hosted at the Internet Archive
 .

External links 

 
 

 
1983 in international relations
1983 in South Korea
1983 in the Soviet Union
1983 in the United States
1983 in military history
Marine salvage operations
Military scandals
Transport in Sakhalin Oblast
Mass murder in 1983
Violations of Soviet airspace
Soviet Union–United States relations
Korea–Soviet Union relations
1983 controversies
Airliner shootdown incidents
Aviation accidents and incidents in 1983
Aviation accidents and incidents in Russia
Aviation accidents and incidents in the Soviet Union
Aviation accidents and incidents in the Pacific Ocean
Airliner accidents and incidents caused by pilot error
Accidents and incidents involving the Boeing 747
007
20th-century aircraft shootdown incidents
September 1983 events in Asia
War scare
1983 disasters in Oceania